Petra (or ) is a former village in Cyprus, now uninhabited and largely destroyed. It is located east of the town of Lefka and just north the Green Line. De facto, Petra is under the control of Northern Cyprus.

Petra had a mixed Greek and Turkish Cypriot population with a Greek Cypriot majority. Some of the village has been used as a military camp.

References

Communities in Nicosia District
Populated places in Lefke District
Greek Cypriot villages depopulated during the 1974 Turkish invasion of Cyprus
Former populated places in Cyprus